The UNESCO Creative Cities Network (UCCN) is a project of UNESCO launched in 2004 to promote cooperation among cities which recognized creativity as a major factor in their urban development. , there are almost 300 cities from around 90 countries in the network. 

The network aims to foster mutual international cooperation with and between member cities committed to invest in creativity as a driver for sustainable urban development, social inclusion and cultural vibrancy. The Network recognizes the following creative fields:

The overall situation and activities within the Network is reported in the  UCCN Membership Monitoring Reports, each for a 4-year period for a particular city.

The Network recognizes the concept of creative tourism, defined as travel associated with creative experience and participation.

Film

Literature

Music

Crafts and Folk Arts

Design 

UNESCO's Design Cities project is part of the wider Creative Cities Network. To be approved as a Design City, cities need to meet a number of criteria set by UNESCO. The Design Cities are:

Gastronomy

Media Arts 

Guadalajara (Mexico) became a UNESCO Creative City of Media Arts in 2017.

York (UK) became a UNESCO Creative City of Media Arts in 2014.

References

External links
 
 

UNESCO
Organizations established in 2004
Creativity